Year of the Horse is a live album by Neil Young and Crazy Horse, following the band on their 1996 tour. It accompanies the film of the same name, but has a different track listing from the film.

It peaked at number 57 on the Billboard 200 chart, as well as number 36 on the UK Albums Chart.

Track listing

Personnel
 Neil Young – guitar, piano, harmonica, vocals
 Poncho Sampedro – guitar, keyboards, vocals
 Billy Talbot – bass guitar, vocals
 Ralph Molina – drums, percussion, vocals
 John Hausmann – recording
 Tim Mulligan – mixing, mastering
 Gary Burden – art direction, design
 Jenice Heo – art direction, design
 Lars Larsen – cover photography
 L.A. Johnson – back cover photography
 Jim Jarmusch – inside photography

Charts

References

1997 albums
Neil Young albums
Reprise Records albums
Albums produced by Neil Young